Max Koch may also refer to:

 Maxwell "Max" Koch (1854–1925), German-born Australian botanical collector
 Max Koch (academic) (1855–1931), German historian and literary critic
 Max Friedrich Koch (1859–1930), German history painter and photographer
 Max Koch (Fritz Muliar), Inspector Rex television character